The 2016 Tour de Wallonie is a five-stage men's professional road cycling race. It is the forty-third running of the Tour de Wallonie. The race started on 23 July in Charleroi and finished on 27 July in Dison.

Schedule

Teams
The eighteen teams invited to participate in the Tour de Wallonie were:

Stages

Stage 1
23 July 2016 – Charleroi to Mettet,

Stage 2
24 July 2016 – Saint-Ghislain to Le Rœulx,

Stage 3
25 July 2016 – Braine-l'Alleud to Vielsalm,

Stage 4
26 July 2016 – Aubel to Herstal,

Stage 5
27 July 2016 – Engis to Dison,

Classification leadership

Note:
 During stage 2, the green jersey was worn by Jonas van Genechten as second in the points standings, as leader Tom Boonen was already wearing the yellow jersey.
 During stage 3, the green jersey was worn by Jonas van Genechten as third in the points standings, as leader Tom Boonen was already wearing the yellow jersey and second places Boris Vallée was already wearing the white jersey.

References

External links
 
 

Tour de Wallonie
Tour de Wallonie
Tour de Wallonie